Kamrieng is a district (srok) of Battambang province, in north-western Cambodia.

Administration
The district is subdivided into 6 communes (khum).

Communes and villages

References

 
Districts of Battambang province